Michael Mark Pettine (born September 25, 1966) is an American football coach who is the assistant head coach for the Minnesota Vikings of the National Football League (NFL). He was the head coach of the Cleveland Browns  from 2014 to 2015, and has also served as the defensive coordinator for the Buffalo Bills, New York Jets, and Green Bay Packers.

Playing career
Pettine earned all-state honors as a quarterback and defensive back at Central Bucks High School West. The head coach was his father,  Mike Pettine Sr., who is renowned in Pennsylvania for compiling a record of 326–42–4 in 33 seasons and winning four state championships.

Pettine played free safety at the University of Virginia graduating in 1988 with a bachelor's degree in economics.

Coaching career

High school
Pettine  coached high school football in Pennsylvania at North Penn and William Tennent high schools after working as a graduate assistant at the University of Pittsburgh (1993–1994). He also spent four years as an assistant coach under his father at Central Bucks West High School. In 1999, a New York Times TV crew documented the North Penn football season for ESPN in a film titled The Season. The TV show consisted of two separate hours and followed the team behind the scenes during the 1999 season and highlighted the rivalry between North Penn and Central Bucks West.

National Football League

Baltimore Ravens
Pettine joined the Ravens in 2001 and was promoted to OLB's coach in 2005 when Rex Ryan became defensive coordinator.

New York Jets
Pettine, as Rex Ryan's "right-hand man", reportedly received a three-year deal to lead the Jets defense. Pettine has been credited with contributing strongly to the Jets number one defense in the NFL in 2009. His tenure with the Jets ended after the 2012 season, with the expiration of his contract.

Buffalo Bills
Pettine was hired to be the defensive coordinator of the Buffalo Bills on January 9, 2013.

Cleveland Browns
Pettine was hired to be the head coach of the Cleveland Browns on January 23, 2014. Pettine started 7–4 in the 2014 season, but the Browns lost their final 5 games to finish at 7–9. The Browns were 3–13 the following season. On January 3, 2016, the same day the Browns lost their last game of the season to finish 3–13, Pettine was fired, along with general manager Ray Farmer. Pettine went 10–22 in his two seasons as Cleveland's head coach, losing 18 of his final 21 games.

Seattle Seahawks
In 2017, Pettine worked as a consultant for the Seattle Seahawks.

Green Bay Packers
On January 10, 2018, Pettine was hired as defensive coordinator by the Green Bay Packers by head coach Mike McCarthy. On December 2, 2018, the Packers fired McCarthy after a 20–17 loss to the Arizona Cardinals at home, and he was replaced by interim head coach Joe Philbin.  On January 7, 2019, the Packers hired Matt LaFleur as their new head coach, who announced he would retain Pettine as defensive coordinator through the 2019 season.

During his time with the Packers, Pettine improved the Packers defense from the league's 29th ranked unit in 2018 to the 15th ranked unit in 2019 and 17th ranked in 2020. However, he was widely criticized for his calls in the playoffs, particularly in the Packers' losses in back-to-back NFC Championship games. In the 2019 NFC Championship Game, Pettine's defense gave up 285 rushing yards to the NFC champion San Francisco 49ers, on their way to a 37–20 loss. In the 2020 NFC Championship Game, the Packers defense picked off quarterback Tom Brady three times, but also gave up a late first-half touchdown when Pettine called for cornerback Kevin King to cover receiver Scotty Miller one-on-one. Pettine's call was widely criticized by many, including his own head coach.

On January 29, 2021, Pettine was let go by the Green Bay Packers as the defensive coordinator; his contract had expired and the Packers reportedly did not move to extend it.

Chicago Bears
On February 10, 2021, Pettine was hired by the Chicago Bears as a senior defensive assistant under head coach Matt Nagy. Pettine would not be retained under new head coach Matt Eberflus.

Minnesota Vikings
Pettine joined the Minnesota Vikings on February 13, 2022, as the senior defensive assistant under head coach Kevin O'Connell.

Head coaching record

Personal life
Pettine has 3 children-Megan, Ryan and Katie Pettine. His wife- Megan, also has 3 children- Paige, Max and McKenna Cuevas.

References

External links
Cleveland Browns bio
Buffalo Bills bio

1966 births
Living people
American football safeties
American people of Italian descent
Buffalo Bills coaches
Baltimore Ravens coaches
Cleveland Browns head coaches
Green Bay Packers coaches
National Football League defensive coordinators
New York Jets coaches
Pittsburgh Panthers football coaches
Virginia Cavaliers football players
High school football coaches in Pennsylvania
People from Doylestown, Pennsylvania
People from Strongsville, Ohio
Players of American football from Pennsylvania
Chicago Bears coaches
Minnesota Vikings coaches